The Rijeka Open is a professional tennis tournament played on outdoor red clay courts. It is currently part of the Association of Tennis Professionals (ATP) Challenger Tour. It is held annually in Rijeka, Croatia, since 2007.

Past finals

Singles

Doubles

References

External links
ITF Search

 
ATP Challenger Tour
Clay court tennis tournaments
Sport in Rijeka
Tennis tournaments in Croatia
Recurring sporting events established in 2007
2007 establishments in Croatia